Joe Clifford is an American author and editor. His work crosses genres but features mystery and crime fiction. Past struggles with addiction, about which he is candid, have fundamentally influenced his writing.

Background 
Clifford, a native of Berlin, Connecticut, quit Central Connecticut State University and moved to San Francisco in 1992 to pursue a career in rock 'n' roll music. While there, Clifford fell into heroin addiction, which lasted until he hit bottom in 2001. After numerous failed attempts at rehab, he finally embarked on a lasting recovery. He pursued a new direction, earning an MFA in creative writing at Florida International University, where he studied under James W. Hall, Les Standiford, and Lynne Barrett.

Clifford's personal memoir-cum-novel, Junkie Love (2013), portrays his descent and recovery. Addiction is also a prominent theme in his "Jay Porter" mystery series.  In interviews, Clifford has described his credo as a writer as "gritty, real and raw," which is also the motto he has given to a series of lectures that he has produced. These lectures, he has said, "mine true stories of the marginalized to laugh, cringe and shine a light on the human condition."

Awards and recognitions 
Clifford received an Acker Award in 2013. This tribute, named for Kathy Acker, is given to members of the avant garde arts community who have made outstanding contributions in their discipline in defiance of convention, or else served their fellow writers and artists in outstanding ways.

Previously, in 2012, Clifford was nominated for a Pushcart Prize for his story "Stuck Between Stations."

He went on to be nominated twice in 2015 for an Anthony Award, both as novelist and editor.
He also received two Anthony Award nominations in 2018, for Best Novel in a Series and editor.

Clifford's Rag and Bone was nominated in 2020 for Best Hardcover Novel in the International Thriller Writers Awards.

Bibliography 
Clifford's first three books were the following:

 Choice Cuts (2012): A collection of short stories. 
 Junkie Love (2013, re-released in 2018 with a new foreword by Jerry Stahl and afterword by Clifford): A personal memoir-cum-novel billed as "a story of recovery and redemption." 
 Wake the Undertaker (2013): A noir thriller set in an alternative, darker Bay Area city. 

They were followed by the Jay Porter series, featuring a New Hampshire man who faces a variety of mysteries and personal challenges.

 Lamentation (2014): Nominated for an Anthony Award in 2015 for Best Novel. 
 December Boys (2015): 
 Give Up the Dead (2017): Nominated for an Anthony Award in 2018 (the Bill Crider Award for Best Novel in a Series). 
 Broken Ground (2018): 
 Rag and Bone (2019): Nominated by International Thriller Writers for Best Hardcover Novel in 2020. 

An additional trio of standalone novels was written at the same time as the Porter series.

 The One That Got Away (2018): A psychological thriller. 
 Skunk Train (2019): A modern-day love story set against the backdrop of the Northern California marijuana trade. 
 Occam's Razor (2020): A thriller set in Miami. 

These works also appeared from 2020 on:

 The Lakehouse (2020): Psychological thriller set in Connecticut. 
 The Shadow People (2021): Psychological thriller with elements of horror. 

Clifford has contributed to these short-story collections:

 Culprits (2018): Linked anthology following the aftermath of a heist. . Developed into a TV series for Disney+ debuting in the fall of 2021, created and directed by J Blakeson.
 The Eviction of Hope (2021): Crime fiction anthology about the residents of a low-end Spokane dwelling targeted for redevelopment. . Clifford's entry was co-authored with his old friend and fellow author Tom Pitts.

He has also edited the following short-story collections:

 Trouble in the Heartland (2014): Crime Stories Inspired by the Songs of Bruce Springsteen. Nominated for an Anthony Award in 2015 for Best Anthology/Short Story Collection. In shepherding the project, Clifford was able to bring his fellow FIU creative writing program alum Dennis Lehane on board to write the leadoff story. Clifford, who counts Springsteen as a major writing influence, wrote the introduction. 
 Hard Sentences (2017): Crime Fiction Inspired by Alcatraz (co-editor with David James Keaton). 
 Just to Watch Them Die (2017): Crime Fiction Inspired by the Songs of Johnny Cash. Nominated for an Anthony Award in 2018 for Best Anthology.

Additional literary activity 
Clifford also serves as acquisitions editor for Gutter Books. Previously, he was producer of Lip Service West, a reading series in Oakland, California. He was also one of the chief editors for "Out of the Gutter Online" (a website for flash fiction affiliated with Gutter Books).

He teaches writing as well, including online classes for LitReactor.com and instruction at conferences and retreats.

Ongoing musical pursuits 
Clifford has continued to record with his band, The Wandering Jews.

Personal life 
Clifford and his wife Justine are the parents of two young sons.

External links

L.A. Weekly interview, August 15, 2013
Literaryorphans.org interview, September 30, 2012
The Fix, November 2, 2014. Ranks Junkie Love among the top four recovery memoirs, along with those by Jerry Stahl, Colin Broderick, and Alan Kaufman (writer).
Backstreets.com (Bruce Springsteen online magazine) interview for Trouble in the Heartland
NJArts.net Institute for Nonprofit News
Fox61 TV interview for December Boys, September 2016
Fox61 TV interview for Give Up the Dead, August 2017
LitReactor.com

References 

American mystery writers
Writers from Connecticut
Living people
Central Connecticut State University alumni
Florida International University alumni
People from Berlin, Connecticut
Writers from San Francisco
Year of birth missing (living people)